The 1999 Nebraska Cornhuskers football team represented the University of Nebraska–Lincoln in the 1999 NCAA Division I-A football season. The team was coached by Frank Solich and played their home games in Memorial Stadium in Lincoln, Nebraska.

As of the 2022 season, this season was the most recent conference championship for Nebraska.

Schedule

Roster and coaching staff

Depth chart

Game summaries

Iowa

California

Southern Miss

Missouri

Oklahoma State

Iowa State

Texas

Kansas

Texas A&M

Kansas State

Colorado

Texas

Tennessee

Rankings

After the season
Nebraska's longtime Defensive Coordinator Charlie McBride retired after another season of success, helping Nebraska win the Big 12 Championship, with a final record of 12–1 (7–1).  McBride's retirement followed 22 years of storied service to the Cornhuskers.

The season was concluded by #3 Nebraska defeating #6 Tennessee 31–21 at the Fiesta Bowl.

Second-year Head Coach Frank Solich's career record improved to 21–5 (12–4).

Awards

NFL and pro players
The following Nebraska players who participated in the 1999 season later moved on to the next level and joined a professional or semi-pro team as draftees or free agents.

References

Nebraska
Nebraska Cornhuskers football seasons
Big 12 Conference football champion seasons
Fiesta Bowl champion seasons
Nebraska Cornhuskers football